Manimutharu is a panchayat town in Tirunelveli district in the Indian state of Tamil Nadu.

Demographics

According to the 2001 Indian census, Manimutharu had a population of 50,000. The female/male ratio was 2:1. Manimutharu had an average literacy rate of 74%, higher than the national average of 59.5%. The literacy rate was equal between males and females. In Manimutharu, 11% of the population was under 6 years of age.

Villages
 Chettimedu
 Aladiyoor
 Ayan Singampatti
 Cash Keeper Thoppu
 Adivaram (Mill Gate)
 Mela Ermalpuram
 Jamin Singampatti
 Korayarkulam
 Manimutharu
 Manjolai (Tea Estate)
 Thirupathiyapuram
 Vempaiyapuram
 Kudhira Mukku
 keela Earmalpuram

Manjolai Hills 
Located on top of the Manimuthar Dam and the Manimuthar waterfalls, the Manjolai area comprises tea plantations and small settlements around them, Upper Kodaiyar Dam and a windy viewpoint called Kuthiravetti.
 
The tea plantations and the whole of Manjolai estates are operated by the Bombay Burmah Trading Corporation on forest lands leased from the government of Tamil Nadu. The three tea estates within the Manjolai area are Manjolai Estate, Manimutharu Estate and Oothu Estate. The estates are at elevations between 2300 feet and 4200 feet.

Schools
 Saraswathi Isac Primary School, Thirupathiyapuram
 Rich Matriculation Higher Secondary School, Chettimedu
 Ganthi Primary School, Chettimedu
 Government Middle School, Aladiyoor
 Avvaiyar Elementary School, Mela Earmalpuram.
 Manimutharu Higher Secondary School, Manimuthar
 Murugathsa Elementary School, Keela Earmalpuram

References

Cities and towns in Tirunelveli district